Defining equation may refer to:

Defining equation (physics)
Defining equation (physical chemistry)

See also
Physical quantity